Across Five Aprils is a novel by Irene Hunt, published in 1964 and winner of a 1965 Newbery Honor, set in the Civil War era. Hunt was close to her grandfather who told her stories from his youth, which she incorporated into Across Five Aprils. Across Five Aprils is often considered the first novel of the Young Adult genre.

Background
Hunt published her first book, Across Five Aprils, at age 61. She researched the historical facts and integrated stories that were told to her by her grandfather. The Creighton family was documented in those stories and in letters and records. Like Jethro, the book's protagonist, her grandfather was only nine when the Civil War erupted, so Hunt used him as a vehicle through which to imagine what a family must have gone through at that time.

Summary

Background summary
Matthew and Ellen Creighton have borne 12 children. Four remain living at home (Bill, Tom, Jenny and Jethro); John lives nearby with his wife Nancy and their two boys. Matthew's orphaned nephew Ebenezer Carron also lives at the homestead. Three of their children died within four days in July 1852 of “Childhood Paralysis.” The deaths of the “three little boys” led Ellen to be more lenient on youngest son Jethro (main character) than with her older children. Shadrach Yale is the schoolmaster from Pennsylvania that has noted the potential of young Jethro. He also has the love of 14-year-old Jenny Creighton, and wants a marriage, which her father disapproves due to her youth. Daughter Mary Ellen's death is of major importance in the story. She was headed home from a dance in her escort's wagon when one of the Burdow boys fired a weapon meant to scare the team. The wagon crashed and overturned, killing Mary instantly. The Burdows are a disrespected family, bearing the burden of gossip surrounding the family patriarch's reason for leaving his home state. The successive generations have been mocked and ostracized based on this gossip. The death of Mary Ellen further destroys their reputation in the community. Matthew Creighton is credited with preventing a mob from retaliating against the Burdow family.

Plot Summary
Across Five Aprils is set in Jasper County, Illinois. The story begins in mid-April, 1861 on the Creighton farm. Nine-year-old Jethro Creighton and his mother Ellen have just started a long day of planting potatoes, unaware that the long-festering turmoil in the country has already exploded into battle. Ellen is preoccupied with concerns for her older boys should they be called to serve. Jethro is excited at the prospect of war, like his brother Tom and cousin Eb. He little understands the reasons for or the reality of what lies ahead. In the late afternoon, Ellen's nephew Wilse Graham from Kentucky arrives on a rare visit. During the evening meal, the discussion grows heated as Wilse accuses Northern industrialists of attacking slavery as a way to gain public support of their battle against Southern agriculture interests. The normally quiet Bill speaks in agreement with Wilse although he decries slavery. Matt Creighton condemns the immorality of slavery. The discussion leads Jethro to a realization that war is more than a proof of strength. He struggles to understand issues beyond his years. Even though they have all worked hard all day and can expect more tomorrow, the entire family waits until late in the night for the school-teacher Shadrach Yale's return from a trip into Newton. He brings news of the taking of Fort Sumter. War has arrived.

The first battles of the war occur without Creighton family involvement. Tom and Eb leave in the fall as soon as they can be spared of farm work. John is making preparations to leave in mid-winter after harvest has settled his family's needs. Shad has plans to stay until the winter school term is over. Bill is quiet and spends a great deal of time attending rallies; obviously troubled. In late autumn, his opinions on the war lead to a physical altercation with his brother John. He leaves for Kentucky, telling Jeth, “My heart ain’t in this war. . . and while I say that the right ain’t all on the side of the North, I know jest as well that it ain’t all on the side of the South either. But if I have to fight, I reckon it will be fer the South.”

In February 1862, Jethro spends an evening with Shadrach Yale, the teacher he idolizes. Yale plans to marry Jenny and return east, taking Jethro with them for schooling. He gives Jethro his books and encourages him to read and study while he is away. He asks him to study the battles in the newspapers as they will soon be in the history books Jethro will study in school.

In March 1862, with all the other boys gone to war, Jethro drives the wagon to Newton for supplies. He is fearful because he must pass the Burdow house. He arrives in town safely, but is accosted in the general store by Guy Wortman regarding his brother Bill. “Is yore pa good and down on Bill? Does he teach you yore brother is a skunk that deserves shootin’ fer goin’ against his country?” Jethro defends his brother which angers Wortman. The newspaper editor Ross Milton intervenes and the store owner Sam Gardiner calls out Wortman for attacking Creighton rather than going to fight. Milton gives Jethro a book on improving his dialect and encourages him to leave for home immediately. Dave Burdow is waiting for Jethro on his way home. He asks for a ride, telling him "There be things that's evil in these woods tonight." Burdow takes the reins and is able to control the team when a man runs out and whips the horses. After Jethro reaches homes and tells the family of the attack, Matt Creighton prepares to go into town to learn more about Wortman. Ellen encourages him to speak with Burdow as well. “We’ve held it against him that his boy stuck a knife it our hearts; now he's grabbed a second knife that was aimed at us.” Creighton suffers an attack that takes his strength and health. Jethro is suddenly thrust into a role of responsibility far beyond his years. He must tend not only his family's farm but his brother John's as well. He must do work with only the help of his sister and neighbors here and there that was done by six men the year before. Jethro and Jenny work hard but still find time to keep up their studies as Shad requested.

Several weeks later, Jethro wakes to the smell of smoke. The vigilantes angered at Bill's disaffection to the South have set the barn on fire and poured coal oil into the well. The Creighton's receive support from all over the county after the attack, including from Dave Burdow. 

Summer brings news of a battle at a place called Shiloh and an influx of wounded soldiers returning home. One of the soldiers reports the death of Tom Creighton. Ross Milton prints a letter in the newspaper to those who attacked the Creightons. He calls them out for attacking an ailing man and asks, “Has this man suffered enough to satisfy your patriotic zeal?

By December 1862, deserters are becoming a problem in southern Illinois. In February, three Federal Registrars visit the Creighton farm, searching for Eb. He has deserted the army. In early March, Jethro finds Eb hiding in the woods. He is sickly and thin, regretting the moment of weakness when he deserted. Jethro agonizes over what to do. He knows the family could be punished for harboring Eb but he also cannot send his cousin off to die of starvation and deprivation. He considers telling his father but realizes that only puts the problem on Matthew's shoulders. One night when he can't sleep, he pens a letter to Abraham Lincoln asking him for guidance. To his surprise, Jethro receives a letter from the President, informing him that Lincoln also has been agonizing over this issue and has decided to allow any deserter the opportunity to return to the army by April 1 without punishment.

In July 1863 a letter comes from Shadrach Yale's aunt in Washington. He was severely wounded at Gettysburg. She asks for Jenny to come. Matt allows her to go to him and Shad improves under her care. Matt gives permission and they are married at Shad's bedside.

In December 1864, Nancy receives a letter from John. He found Bill among prisoners in a Nashville camp. They talked as brothers and Bill asked for all the news of home. Upon leaving, Bill asked John to convey a message to their mother Ellen. Bill was not present at Pittsburgh Landing. It was not his bullet that killed Tom.

1865 arrives with the final limping days of battles. Lincoln's plan for reunification is universally disliked: in the South for being too harsh, in the North for being too soft. Jethro is 13 and knows the reality of war now. He is beginning to realize that peace too will be different than his expectations. The fifth April of the war finally arrives and with it the sound of guns silenced. The armistice is signed.

Jethro enjoys the celebration with Ross Milton in Newton. Jethro thinks of the lined face of President Lincoln. “How I'd like to shake hands with him tonight,” he thinks. Following the celebration, he returns to working the fields and enjoying the beautiful colors of spring. Until the day he sees Nancy running toward him in the field. “Jeth, it's the President—they've killed the President.”

Jethro mourns the loss of the man he had never met yet considered a friend. He mourns the loss of the President who offered a merciful and fair reunification of the country. His grief is softened by the return of Shad and Jenny. When Eb and John return to the farm, Jethro will go with Shad and Jenny back east. He will receive the education Ellen wants for him. He will return and bring that education to future generations of the Creighton family.

Children of Matthew and Ellen Creighton

Benjamin Hardin Creighton       Birth 1832	(Left for California in 1849, whereabouts unknown)
	
Lydia Creighton			Birth 1834	(Married and Moved to Ohio)		

Lucinda Creighton		Birth 1834	(Married and Moved to Ohio)

John Robert Creighton		Birth 1837

William (Bill) Taylor Creighton	Birth 1838

Thomas Ward Creighton	        May 10, 1843 – April 6, 1862		Died in battle of Shiloh at Pittsburg Landing

Mary Ellen Creighton		1844-Jan 12, 1859	                Died in Wagon accident caused by Travis Burdow firing shot at horses

Jenny Elizabeth Creighton 	Birth sometime early in 1847	

Nathan Hale Creighton 		Feb 12, 1848-July 3, 1852		Died of Childhood paralysis

James Alexander Creighton 	May 3, 1849 – July 4, 1852		Died of Childhood paralysis

Matthew Colvin Creighton 	Sept 7, 1850-July 1, 1852		Died of Childhood paralysis

Jethro Hallam Creighton 	January 13, 1852

The real Jethro Creighton who this character was based upon died on November 3, 1929, at 3:35 pm, aged 77.

Awards and nominations
 1964 – the Charles W. Follett Award
 
 1965 – Dorothy Canfield Fisher Award (nominated), the Clara Ingram Judson Memorial Award, Newbery Honor Book
 1966 – Lewis Carroll Shelf Award 
 1997 – Charles W. D. W. Award

Screen adaptation
The novel was adapted to screen in 1990 by Kevin Meyer and starred Todd Duffey and Miriam Byrd-Nethery.

References

American children's novels
Children's historical novels
Novels set during the American Civil War
Works about children in war
Newbery Honor-winning works
Novels set in Illinois
1964 American novels
Jasper County, Illinois
1964 children's books